Jorge Miguel Feijoca Chula (born 13 February 1990) is a Portuguese footballer who plays for Luxembourg club FC Jeunesse Canach mainly as a right winger.

Club career
Born in Benavente, Santarém District, Chula alternated between the second and third divisions in his first three and a half years as a senior. He made his Primeira Liga debut during the 2012–13 season with Moreirense F.C. after signing on loan from Sporting CP in January 2013, but totalled only 189 minutes of action and also saw his team be relegated; additionally, he also served a one-year loan at VVV-Venlo from the Dutch Eredivisie.

Chula appeared in a further two matches in his country's top flight in the 2013–14 campaign, with C.S. Marítimo, on both occasions as a substitute as he featured mainly for the reserves in the second tier. He joined A Lyga winners FK Žalgiris on 17 June 2015 from C.D. Aves, leaving the team by mutual agreement on 25 February 2017.

References

External links

1990 births
Living people
People from Benavente, Portugal
Sportspeople from Santarém District
Portuguese footballers
Association football wingers
Primeira Liga players
Liga Portugal 2 players
Segunda Divisão players
FC Porto players
G.D. Tourizense players
U.D. Leiria players
S.C. Covilhã players
Sporting CP B players
Moreirense F.C. players
C.S. Marítimo players
C.D. Aves players
Merelinense F.C. players
Juventude de Pedras Salgadas players
Eredivisie players
VVV-Venlo players
A Lyga players
FK Žalgiris players
Armenian Premier League players
FC Gandzasar Kapan players
Portugal youth international footballers
Portuguese expatriate footballers
Expatriate footballers in the Netherlands
Expatriate footballers in Lithuania
Expatriate footballers in Armenia
Expatriate footballers in Luxembourg
Portuguese expatriate sportspeople in the Netherlands
Portuguese expatriate sportspeople in Lithuania
Portuguese expatriate sportspeople in Armenia
Portuguese expatriate sportspeople in Luxembourg